The prime minister of Cambodia is the head of government of the Kingdom of Cambodia. The prime minister is also the chairman of the Council of Ministers, and represents the government at home and abroad. Under the current constitution, the prime minister is elected to a five-year term, with no limits imposed on the office. Since 1945, there have been 36 prime ministers, including 4 who served in acting capacity.

Constitutionally the prime minister is required to be a member of the National Assembly. He must also gain their approval through a resolution before an official appointment by the King can take place. The traditional swearing-in ceremony takes place at the Royal Palace where the prime minister-elect has to take an oath of office in front of the King and the two Patriarch monks.

The current prime minister of Cambodia is Hun Sen, since 14 January 1985.

Key
Political parties

Other factions

Prime ministers

Timeline

See also
 Monarchy of Cambodia
 List of heads of state of Cambodia
 Prime Minister of Cambodia

Notes

References

Cambodia

Prime Ministers